La voglia, la pazzia, l'incoscienza, l'allegria is a studio album by Italian singer Ornella Vanoni, recorded in collaboration with Brazilian singer-songwriter Vinicius de Moraes and guitarist Toquinho. The album was released in 1976 by Vanilla in Italy.

In 2012, Rolling Stone placed the album on the 76th place of the list of the hundred best Italian albums.

Track listing

Personnel
 Ornella Vanoni – vocals
 Vinicius de Moraes – vocals
 Toquinho – vocals, guitar
 Azeitona – bass
 Mutinho – drums
 I musicals di Dino Comolli – background vocals
 Gianfranco Lombardi – arrangement

Charts

References

External links
 

1976 albums
Ornella Vanoni albums
Vinicius de Moraes albums
Toquinho albums
Italian-language albums
Portuguese-language albums
Collaborative albums